Osprey Falls is a waterfall on the Gardner River in northwestern Yellowstone National Park in the United States. The falls are located within Sheepeater Canyon and are reachable via the Osprey Falls trail.

History
Members of the Hague Survey named the waterfall in 1885 for the osprey (Pandion haliaetus) that frequents Yellowstone Park.

In 1886, in his Through the Yellowstone Park on Horseback, George Wood Wingate, a former officer in the Union Army, described the falls:

See also
 Waterfalls in Yellowstone National Park

Notes

Waterfalls of Wyoming
Waterfalls of Yellowstone National Park
Tourist attractions in Park County, Wyoming